Tropic of Ruislip is a 1974 novel by British author Leslie Thomas. It explores the British class divide and themes such as wife swapping. The title refers to Ruislip, one of London's outer suburbs, but the book is set in another suburb, Carpenders Park.

The book sold well, although Thomas' later work never matched the success of his first novel, The Virgin Soldiers, published in 1966.

Setting

The book is set in the suburbs of London, specifically "Plummers Park", which is apparently a fictional version of Carpenders Park, where the author lived in the 1960s. Carpenders Park railway station is on a commuter railway line. In the book a railway line marks a physical and social divide between a council estate and middle class housing, mirroring to some extent the real-life division between Carpenders Park and South Oxhey.

Other locations in the book include Watford, where the male protagonist Andrew is employed by a local newspaper.

Adaptation
It was adapted for television in 1979 as "Tropic" with a cast including Ronald Pickup.

References

1974 British novels
Adultery in novels
British novels adapted into television shows
Novels set in Hertfordshire
Methuen Publishing books